A pulsed nuclear thermal rocket is a type of nuclear thermal rocket (NTR) concept developed at the Polytechnic University of Catalonia, Spain, and presented at the 2016 AIAA/SAE/ASEE Propulsion Conference for thrust and specific impulse (Isp) amplification in a conventional nuclear thermal rocket.

The pulsed nuclear thermal rocket is a bimodal rocket able to work in a stationary (at constant nominal power as in a conventional NTR), and as well as a pulsed mode as a TRIGA-like reactor, making possible the production of high power and an intensive neutron flux in short time intervals. In contrast to nuclear reactors where velocities of the coolant are no larger than a few meters per second and thus, typical residence time is on seconds, however, in rockets chambers with subsonic velocities of the propellant around hundreds of meters per second, residence time are around 
 to : and then a long power pulse translates into an important gain in energy in comparison with the stationary mode. The gained energy by pulsing the nuclear core can be used for thrust amplification by increasing the propellant mass flow, or using the intensive neutron flux to produce a very high specific impulse amplification – even higher than the fission-fragment rocket, wherein the pulsed rocket the final propellant temperature is only limited by the radiative cooling after the pulsation.

Statement of the concept 

A rough calculation for the energy gain by using a pulsed thermal nuclear rocket in comparison with the conventional stationary mode is as follows.
The energy stored into the fuel after a pulsation is the sensible heat stored because the fuel temperature increase. This energy may be written as

where:
 is the sensible heat stored after pulsation, 
 is the fuel heat capacity,
 is the fuel mass,
 is the  temperature increase  between pulsations.

On the other hand, the energy generated in the stationary mode, i.e., when the nuclear core operates at nominal constant power is given by

where:
 is the linear power of the fuel (power per length of fuel), 
 is the length of the fuel,
 is the residence time of the propellant in the chamber.

Also, for the case of cylindrical geometries for the nuclear fuel we have

 
and the linear power given by  

Where:
 is the  radius of the cylindrical fuel, 
 the fuel density,
 the fuel thermal conductivity,  
 is the fuel temperature at the center line,
 is the surface or cladding temperature.
 
Therefore, the  energy ratio between the pulsed mode and the stationary mode,  yields

Where the term inside the bracket,    is the quenching rate.

With these values the gain in energy is approximately given by:

More rigorous calculations considering the transient heat transfer theory  shows energy gains around hundreds or thousands times, i.e.,  .

Direct thrust amplification
The most direct way to harness the amplified energy by pulsing the nuclear core is by increasing the thrust via increasing the propellant mass flow.

Increasing the thrust in the stationary mode -where power is fixed by thermodynamic constraints, is only possible by sacrificing exhaust velocity. In fact, the power is given by

where   is the power,   is the thrust and  the exhaust velocity. On the other hand, thrust is given by

where    is the propellant mass flow.  Thus, if it is desired to increase the thrust, say, n-times in the stationary mode, it will be necessary to increase -times  the propellant mass flow, and decreasing   -times the exhaust velocity. However, if the nuclear core is pulsed, thrust may be amplified  -times by amplifying the power   -times and the propellant mass flow   -times and keeping constant the exhaust velocity.

Isp amplification

The attainment of high exhaust velocity or  specific impulse (Isp) is the first concern. The most general expression for the Isp is given by  

being  a constant, and   the temperature of the propellant before expansion. Thus,

being  a constant.

In a conventional stationary NTR, the energy  for heating the propellant is almost from the fission fragments which encompass almost 95% of the total energy, and the faction of energy from prompt neutrons  is only around 5%, and therefore, in comparison, is almost negligible. However, if the nuclear core is pulsed it is able to produce   times more energy than the stationary mode, and then the fraction of prompt neutrons or  could be equal or larger than the total energy in the stationary mode. Because fast neutrons created in fission events have very high neutron temperature (2 MeV or 20,000 km/s on average), they are capable of exchanging very large amounts of kinetic energy. Neutrons also exchange kinetic energy much more readily with nucleons of similar mass, so low molar mass propellant can absorb most of it while the heavy atoms in fuel are mostly unaffected. This allows temperatures to be obtained in the propellant that are higher than in the fuel, potentially by orders of magnitude, enabling Isp far beyond what a standard nuclear thermal rocket is capable of.

In summary, if the pulse generates    times more energy than the stationary mode, the Isp amplification is given by

Where:
 is the  amplified specific impulse, 
 the specific impulse in the stationary mode,
  the fraction of prompt neutrons,
 the energy amplification by pulsing the nuclear core.

, the  hypothetical  amplification  attainable makes the concept  specially interesting for interplanetary spaceflight.

Advantages of the design

There are several advantages relative to conventional stationary NTR designs.

The other nuclear rocket concept which allows a propellant hotter than the fuel is the fission fragment rocket. Because it directly uses the fission fragments as a propellant, it can also achieve a very high specific impulse.

Other considerations 

For    amplification, only the energy from prompt neutrons, and some prompt gamma energy, is used for this purpose. The rest of the energy, i.e.,  the almost   from fission fragments is unwanted energy and  must be continuously evacuated by a heat removal auxiliary system  using a suitable  coolant. Liquid metals, and particularly  lithium,  can provide the fast quenching rates required. One aspect to be considered is the large amount of energy which must be evacuated as residual heat (almost 95% of the total energy). This implies a large dedicated heat transfer surface.

As regards to the mechanism for pulsing the core, the pulsed mode can be produced using a variety of configurations depending on the desired frequency of the pulsations. For instance, the use of standard control rods in a single or banked configuration with a motor driving mechanism or the use of standard pneumatically operated pulsing mechanisms are suitable for generating up to 10 pulses per minute. For the production of pulses at rates up to 50 pulsations per second, the use of rotating wheels introducing alternately  neutron poison and fuel or neutron poison and non-neutron poison can be considered. However, for pulsations ranking the thousands of pulses per second (kHz), optical choppers or modern wheels employing magnetic bearings allow to revolve at 10 kHz. If even faster pulsations are desired it would be necessary to make use of a new type of pulsing mechanism that does not involve mechanical motion, for example, lasers (based on the 3He polarization) as early proposed by Bowman, or proton and neutron beams. Frequencies on the order of 1 kHz to 10 kHz are likely choices.

See also 
 Fission fragment rocket

References

Nuclear spacecraft propulsion